La Vie parisienne or Parisian Life may refer to:

 La Vie parisienne (operetta), by Jacques Offenbach
 La Vie Parisienne (magazine), French weekly magazine founded in Paris in 1863
 The Parisian Life (painting), 1892 oil on canvas painting by Juan Luna

Films 
 La Vie parisienne (1936 film), directed by Robert Siodmak
 Parisian Life (1936 film), English remake of the same film
 La Vie parisienne (1977 film), directed by Christian-Jaque